The Quaife R4 GTS is a grand tourer-style race car, designed, developed and produced by British manufacturer Quaife, and built to FIA's GT1 regulations, in 1998.

References

Grand tourer racing cars